Charters House is a Grade II listed building overlooking Sunningdale, Berkshire, built in 1938. The architects were George Adie and H. G. Hammond of Adie, Button and Partners.

Charters was built for the industrialist Frank Parkinson on the site of an earlier house built in the late 1860s by William Terrick Hamilton. Parkinson’s guests included Winston Churchill and the Duke and Duchess of Windsor. In 1949, the house was bought by Sir Montague Burton. It later became a corporate headquarters and has since been redeveloped as an apartment complex and spa.

References

External links

Berkshire, England, designed by Adie, Button and Partners.

Grade II listed buildings in Berkshire
Grade II listed houses
Country houses in Berkshire
Houses completed in 1938
Art Deco architecture in England